Tenmile Corner - so named because it is located 10 miles due east of St. James, on state highway 60 - is an unincorporated community in Fieldon Township, Watonwan County, Minnesota, United States, located between Madelia and St. James on the intersection of highway 60 and highway 15.  Its elevation is 1,030 feet.

Notes

Unincorporated communities in Watonwan County, Minnesota
Unincorporated communities in Minnesota